Gahawa Mai Mandir, also known as Maisthan Mandir, is an historic temple in Birganj, Parsa District,  Nepal. 

Built in the 18th century, Gahawa Mai Mandir was established to honor the  goddess Mai. It is the scene of a large festival during Navratri during which visitors offer animal sacrifices to Mai and also to keep jamara.

Populated places in Parsa District
18th-century establishments in Nepal
Buildings and structures in Parsa District